Mohammed Hanif (born November 1964) is a British Pakistani writer and journalist who writes a monthly opinion piece in The New York Times.

Hanif is the author of the critically acclaimed book A Case of Exploding Mangoes, which was longlisted for the Man Booker Prize, shortlisted for the Guardian First Book Award, and won the Commonwealth Prize for Best Book. His second book, Our Lady of Alice Bhatti, won the Wellcome Book Prize. He also worked as a correspondent for the BBC News based in Karachi and was the writer of the an acclaimed feature film about the city, The Long Night. His work has been published by The New York Times, The Daily Telegraph, The New Yorker and The Washington Post. His play The Dictator's Wife has been staged at the Hampstead Theatre.

Life
He was born in Okara, Punjab. He graduated from Pakistan Air Force Academy as a pilot officer, but subsequently left to pursue a career in journalism. He initially worked for Newsline and wrote for The Washington Post and India Today. 
He is a graduate of the University of East Anglia. 
In 1996, he moved to London to work for the BBC. Later, he became the head of the BBC's Urdu service in London. He moved back to Pakistan in 2008.

Works 
His first novel A Case of Exploding Mangoes (2008) was shortlisted for the 2008 Guardian First Book Award and longlisted for the 2008 Man Booker Prize. It won the 2009 Commonwealth Book Prize in the Best First Book category and the 2008 Shakti Bhatt First Book Prize.

Hanif has also written for the stage and screen, including a feature film, The Long Night (2002), a BBC radio play, What Now, Now That We Are Dead?, and the stage play The Dictator's Wife (2008). His second novel, Our Lady of Alice Bhatti, was published in 2011. It was shortlisted for the Wellcome Trust Book Prize (2012), and the DSC Prize for South Asian Literature (2013).

He is currently collaborating with composer Mohammed Fairouz on an opera titled Bhutto.

In 2018, he wrote a fictional novel called Red Birds.

Hanif's style has often been compared with that of author Salman Rushdie, although Hanif himself disagrees with this assessment. Even though he says that he enjoys reading Rushdie's books, he would not want to suffer the same fate as Rushdie did.

Bibliography

Films
 The Long Night (Script) (2002)

Novels
 A Case of Exploding Mangoes (2008)
 Our Lady of Alice Bhatti (2011)
 The Baloch who is not missing and others who are (2013)
 Red Birds (2018)

Plays
 What Now, Now That We Are Dead? (radio play)
 The Dictator's Wife (2008)

References

External links

Man Booker Prize Interview
An interview with M. Hanif on "Our Lady of Alice Bhatti"
 
Mohammed Hanif: My Country, Caving to the Taliban
Ten Myths About Pakistan- Times of India
Audio slideshow interview with Mohammed Hanif talking about A Case of Exploding Mangoes on The Interview Online
Audio: Mohammed Hanif in conversation on the BBC World Service discussion programme The Forum
"Mohammed Hanif on being longlisted for the Man Booker", manbookerprise.com
Interview with Mohammed Hanif: "People Did Not Want the Taliban"
Mohammad Hanif Articles on BBC Urdu
Interview with Papercuts literary magazine on writing technique, elitism in Pakistani writing in English and hypocrisy in Pakistani society

Pakistani male journalists
Living people
1964 births
Pakistani dramatists and playwrights
Alumni of the University of East Anglia
People from Okara District
Pakistan Air Force Academy alumni
Pakistan Air Force officers
Pakistani expatriates in England
English-language writers from Pakistan
Pakistani male writers
Male journalists
Male dramatists and playwrights
Pakistani novelists
Male novelists
Punjabi people
21st-century novelists
21st-century male writers
Recipients of Sitara-i-Imtiaz